Takéo (lit. 'Crystal Grandfather') is a province (khaet) of Cambodia. Located in the south of Cambodia to the west of Bassac River, Takéo borders the provinces of Kampot to the west, Kampong Speu to the northwest and Kandal to the north and east. Its southern boundary is the international border with Vietnam (An Giang). The provincial capital, recently known as the provincial town Doun Kaev (formerly called Takeo), is a small city with a population of 39,186.

Takéo is often referred to as the "cradle of Khmer civilization" due to the former kingdom of Funan and its successor, Water Chenla, being centered in the region.

Administration
As of 2019, the province has 9 districts and 1 municipality, 97 communes and 3 sangkats and 1,119 villages.

Previously, before Doun Kaev District was renamed to Krong Doun Kaev, the province was subdivided into 10 districts, 100 communes and 1,117 villages.

Sites
 Phnom Chisor is a mountain north of the city of Takeo. At the summit there are temple ruins from the 10th and 11th centuries. From the mountain there is a good view. The climb is 503 steps. At the summit there are simple beverage stalls. A moped can be taken for the 26-kilometer journey.
 Phnom Da – a 17 meter high temple dating back to the Funan kingdom (6th century) on a 100m high hill. It can be reached by an hour boat ride from Takeo. Farmers on the partially flooded rice fields and fishermen and many duck farms can be observed. Large wooden boats deliver cargoes from Vietnam.
 Angkor Borei – On the road from the town of Takeo is Phnom Da temple. Previously, this was an important trading center. At the harbor there is a small museum documenting the Funan kingdom.

Notable people
 Haing S. Ngor, actor, physician, author 
 Ho Vann, politician 
 Kem Ley, activist 
 Kem Sokha, politician 
 Khim Borey, footballer 
 Khun Srun, writer
 Ou Chanrith, politician 
 Pen Sovan, former Prime Minister 
 Prach Chhuon, master of the classical Khmer cultural string instrument of Chapei
 Preah Maha Ghosananda, Supreme Patriarch of Cambodia 
 Sok An, deputy prime minister 
 Ta Mok, former Khmer Rouge militant 
 Yem Ponhearith, politician
 Dr. Kol Pheng, Founder of Pannasastra University of Cambodia
 His Excellency Samdech Vibol Panha Sok An, Minister in Charge of the Office of the Council of Ministers

See also 
 Transport in Cambodia
 Phnom Chisor, an Angkorian site located in Takeo province

References 

	

 
Provinces of Cambodia